Tyronne Roberts-Davis (born 17 August 1997) is an Australian professional rugby league footballer. He is currently on a train and trial contract for the Wests Tigers in the National Rugby League.

He previously played for the Gold Coast Titans in the National Rugby League.

Background
Born in Macksville, New South Wales, Roberts-Davis is of Indigenous Australian Dunghutti descent and played his junior rugby league for the Kempsey Dragons. He was then signed by the Gold Coast Titans.

Roberts-Davis is cousins with former teammate Tyrone Roberts and South Sydney Rabbitohs player James Roberts, and the nephew of former NRL player Amos Roberts.

Playing career

Early career
In 2015 and 2016, Roberts-Davis played for the Gold Coast Titans' NYC team. Late in 2015, he played for the Australian Schoolboys.

2017
In round 2 of the 2017 NRL season, Roberts-Davis made his NRL debut for the Titans against the Newcastle Knights, scoring a try. He went on to play in 6 NRL matches for the Titans in 2017, scoring 2 tries.

2018
Roberts-Davis only managed to play in 1 NRL game for the Titans in 2018.

2019
In 2019, Roberts-Davis spent the entire year playing for the Burleigh Bears in the Queensland Cup, before joining the Newcastle Knights in November for the 2020 pre-season on a train and trial deal.

2020
After playing in the 2020 NRL Nines and two trials for the Knights, Roberts-Davis secured a top 30 NRL contract for the 2020 season.

On 28 April, Roberts-Davis was fined $10,000 by the NRL after breaking social distancing rules during the Coronavirus pandemic.  Roberts-Davis had gone on a camping trip with fellow NRL players Latrell Mitchell and Josh Addo-Carr at Mitchell's farm near Taree.

Roberts-Davis failed to make an appearance for the Knights and was released at the end of the season. In November, he signed with Newcastle Rugby League side Cessnock Goannas for the 2021 season.

References

External links
Burleigh Bears profile
Gold Coast Titans profile

1997 births
Living people
Australian rugby league players
Burleigh Bears players
Cessnock Goannas players
Gold Coast Titans players
Indigenous Australian rugby league players
Rugby league fullbacks
Rugby league wingers
Rugby league players from New South Wales